Johann Matthäus Bechstein Ornithologisches Taschenbuch 1802–1803.
 Matthew Flinders discovered the soon to be extinct Kangaroo Island emu
 George Montagu publishes Ornithogical Dictionary; or Alphabetical Synopsis of British Birds
 Louis Dufresne  popularized the use of arsenical soap for preserving birds in an article in Nouveau dictionnaire d'histoire naturelle a technique which had enabled the Muséum to build the greatest collection of birds in the world.
 John Latham  published Supplementum Indicis Ornithologici, sive Systematis Ornithologiae. In this work he scientifically describes the noisy miner, the white-tailed tropicbird, the azure kingfisher, the rufous whistler and the scarlet honeyeater amongst many other birds.
 The white-naped honeyeater described by Louis Jean Pierre Vieillot and  Jean Baptiste Audebert in Oiseaux dorés, ou à reflets métalliques

Birding and ornithology by year
1802 in science